Melissa Harrison (born 1975) is an English novelist, short story and nature writer.

Biography 
Harrison was born in Effingham Junction, Surrey in 1975. She attended a comprehensive school before studying English Literature at Oxford University, graduating in 1996. After graduating, she worked as a freelance magazine subeditor, while contributing a regular "Nature Notes" column in The Times, columns for The Guardian and contributions to radio and television.

Her first novel, Clay, was published by Bloomsbury in January 2013, followed by At Hawthorn Time in 2015. Her non-fiction books include Rain: Four Walks in English Weather (2016). A third novel, All Among the Barley, was published in August 2018. Her short story The Black Dog was broadcast on BBC Radio 4 in March 2017 and she has contributed episodes to the channel's Tweet of the Day programme. She has also made appearances on the BBC Two series Springwatch. During the 2020 COVID-19 lockdown, she began a nature diary podcast called The Stubborn Light of Things which formed the basis of a new memoir published in November 2020 that outlined her move from urban London to rural Suffolk. Her first children's novel, By Ash, Oak and Thorn was published by Chicken House Books in May 2021.

Awards
 2010: John Muir Trust Wild Writing Award
2019: European Union Prize for Literature for All Among the Barley

References

External links
Richard Powers and nature writing Open Book, Alex Clark interviews Richard Powers, Melissa Harrison and Jessica J Lee 12:00-27min, BBC Radio 4 podcast, 28 August 2018, accessed 2 September 2018.
Melissa Harrison – Novelist and Nature Writer Melissa’s personal website with links to her books, podcast and other work.

1975 births
Living people
21st-century British short story writers
21st-century English women writers
21st-century English writers
British women short story writers
English women novelists
New Statesman people